The name Paeng has been used in the Philippines by PAGASA in the Western Pacific Ocean.

 Typhoon Cimaron (2006) (T0619, 22W, Paeng) – made landfall over the Philippines after its peak strength as a category 5 typhoon.
 Typhoon Nuri (2014) (T1420, 20W, Paeng) – an intense category 5 equivalent typhoon; did not make landfall.
 Typhoon Trami (2018) (T1824, 28W, Paeng) – another Category 5 super typhoon that later made landfall in Japan as a weaker system.
 Severe Tropical Storm Nalgae (2022) (T2222, 26W, Paeng) – a severe tropical storm that devastated the Philippines, claiming more than 120 lives.

Pacific typhoon set index articles